This article is about events that occurred in 1885 in Argentina.

Incumbents
 President: Julio Argentino Roca
 Vice President: Francisco Bernabé Madero

Governors
 Buenos Aires Province: Carlos Alfredo D'Amico 
 Cordoba: Gregorio Gavier
 Mendoza Province: Rufino Ortega
 Santa Fe Province: Manuel María Zavalla

Vice Governors
Buenos Aires Province: Matías Cardoso

Events
June – Former president Nicolás Avellaneda travels to France with his wife, seeking medical treatment for nephritis. The treatment is unsuccessful and 48-year-old Avellaneda, Argentina's youngest-ever president, dies at sea on the return journey.
19 December – The city of Río Gallegos, Santa Cruz, is established, and a naval base created, to increase Argentine control over southern Patagonia.

Births
7 January – Ernesto Brown, footballer (died 1935)
7 September – José Durand Laguna, football manager (died 1965)

Deaths
August – Saturnino María Laspiur, lawyer and politician (born 1829)
13 September – Roque Ferreyra, politician (born 1810)
24 November – Nicolás Avellaneda, 8th President of Argentina (born 1837)

References

 
History of Argentina (1880–1916)
Years of the 19th century in Argentina